The VN20 is a Chinese "Heavy-Duty Infantry fighting vehicle"  developed by Norinco, revealed on the Zhuhai Airshow 2022.

Norinco uses the "VNxx" designation for exported Infantry fighting vehicles.

Design 
The VN20 was developed from the VT-4 main battle tank chassis and uses the same suspension, the motor is placed at the front to keep space for troops in the back. ERA protects its front and sides.

Armament 
The VN20 vehicle was advertised with 2 different turrets:

The exhibit was fitted with 30mm autocannon RCWS , which also houses a coaxial machine gun and a missile launcher.

The catalogue video shows a 2-man turret which consists of a 100mm canon and a 30mm autocannon similar to a BMP-3. The turret also fits HJ-12 launchers and a smaller RCWS mounted on top.

2 remote controlled 7.62mm machine guns can be mounted to the rear.

See also

Developed from 

 VT-4

Heavy Infantry fighting vehicle 

 Namer IFV (60 tonnes, developed from merkava )
 Griffin III (up to 50 tonnes, developed from ASCOD)
 Lynx KF41(up to 50 tonnes)
 T-15 Armata (48 tonnes, developed from the Armata Universal Combat Platform)
 Puma (up to 43 tonnes)
 Ajax (up to 42 tonnes, developed from ASCOD)
 Tulpar (up to 42 tonnes)
 BTR-T (38,5 tonnes, developed from T-55)
 Marder (up to 38 tonnes)
 CV90 Mk IV (up to 37 tonnes)

References 

Norinco
Tracked armoured fighting vehicles
Tracked infantry fighting vehicles